Kristína Kučová was the defending champion, but lost to Stephanie Vogt in the first round.

Petra Cetkovská won the title by defeating Jeļena Ostapenko in the final, 3–6, 7–5, 6–2.

Seeds

Main draw

Finals

Top half

Bottom half

References 
 Main draw

Powiat Poznanski Open - Singles
WSG Open